What's Cooking? was an Australian cooking television series, that aired on the Nine Network in 1991 until 1999.

Hosts
It was originally hosted by chef Gabriel Gaté and television actress Colette Mann until 1993 when production cuts forced the hosts to leave the program, Geoff Jansz took over in 1993. In 1999, Kerri-Anne Kennerley co-hosted the show with Jansz.

Nine Network original programming
Australian cooking television series
1991 Australian television series debuts
1999 Australian television series endings